The Zillergründl Dam is an arch dam on the Ziller River in the upper Ziller Valley of Tyrol state, Austria. The primary purpose of the dam is hydroelectric power production and it supports a 360 MW pumped-storage power station. As part of the Zemm-Ziller Development, construction on the dam began in 1981 and it along with the Häusling Pumped Storage Power Plant were complete in 1986. The power plant was fully commissioned by 1988. The dam is the second tallest in Austria.

Design and operation

It is afforded  of hydraulic head given the difference in elevations. The pumping and replenishment of the reservoir occur at night, during low energy demand periods. The process is repeated; electricity is generated during high-demand periods and pumping occurs during low-demand periods when electricity is cheaper.

See also

List of tallest dams in the world
List of power stations in Austria

References

Dams completed in 1986
Energy infrastructure completed in 1986
Dams in Austria
Hydroelectric power stations in Austria
Arch dams
Pumped-storage hydroelectric power stations in Austria
Lakes of Tyrol (state)